In geometry, dihedral symmetry in three dimensions is one of three infinite sequences of point groups in three dimensions which have a symmetry group that as an abstract group is a dihedral group Dihn (for n ≥ 2).

Types 
There are 3 types of dihedral symmetry in three dimensions, each shown below in 3 notations: Schönflies notation, Coxeter notation, and orbifold notation.

Chiral
Dn, [n,2]+, (22n) of order 2n – dihedral symmetry or para-n-gonal group (abstract group: Dihn).
Achiral
Dnh, [n,2], (*22n) of order 4n – prismatic symmetry or full ortho-n-gonal group (abstract group: Dihn × Z2).
Dnd (or Dnv), [2n,2+], (2*n) of order 4n – antiprismatic symmetry or full gyro-n-gonal group (abstract group: Dih2n).

For a given n, all three have n-fold rotational symmetry about one axis (rotation by an angle of 360°/n does not change the object), and 2-fold rotational symmetry about a perpendicular axis, hence about n of those. For n = ∞, they correspond to three Frieze groups. Schönflies notation is used,  with Coxeter notation in brackets, and orbifold notation in parentheses. The term horizontal (h) is used with respect to a vertical axis of rotation.

In 2D, the symmetry group Dn includes reflections in lines. When the 2D plane is embedded horizontally in a 3D space, such a reflection can either be viewed as the restriction to that plane of a reflection through a vertical plane, or as the restriction to the plane of a rotation about the reflection line, by 180°. In 3D, the two operations are distinguished: the group Dn contains rotations only, not reflections. The other group is pyramidal symmetry Cnv of the same order, 2n.

With reflection symmetry in a plane perpendicular to the n-fold rotation axis, we have Dnh, [n], (*22n).

Dnd (or Dnv), [2n,2+], (2*n) has vertical mirror planes between the horizontal rotation axes, not through them. As a result, the vertical axis is a 2n-fold rotoreflection axis.

Dnh is the symmetry group for a regular n-sided prism and also for a regular n-sided bipyramid. Dnd is the symmetry group for a regular n-sided antiprism, and also for a regular n-sided trapezohedron. Dn is the symmetry group of a partially rotated prism.

n = 1 is not included because the three symmetries are equal to other ones:
D1 and C2: group of order 2 with a single 180° rotation.
D1h and C2v: group of order 4 with a reflection in a plane and a 180° rotation about a line in that plane.
D1d and C2h: group of order 4 with a reflection in a plane and a 180° rotation about a line perpendicular to that plane.

For n = 2 there is not one main axis and two additional axes, but there are three equivalent ones.

D2, [2,2]+, (222) of order 4 is one of the three symmetry group types with the Klein four-group as abstract group. It has three perpendicular 2-fold rotation axes. It is the symmetry group of a cuboid with an S written on two opposite faces, in the same orientation.
D2h, [2,2], (*222) of order 8 is the symmetry group of a cuboid.
D2d, [4,2+], (2*2) of order 8 is the symmetry group of e.g.:
A square cuboid with a diagonal drawn on one square face, and a perpendicular diagonal on the other one.
A regular tetrahedron scaled in the direction of a line connecting the midpoints of two opposite edges (D2d is a subgroup of Td; by scaling, we reduce the symmetry).

Subgroups 

For Dnh, [n,2], (*22n), order 4n
 Cnh, [n+,2], (n*), order 2n
 Cnv, [n,1], (*nn), order 2n
 Dn, [n,2]+, (22n), order 2n

For Dnd, [2n,2+], (2*n), order 4n
 S2n, [2n+,2+], (n×), order 2n
 Cnv, [n+,2], (n*), order 2n
 Dn, [n,2]+, (22n), order 2n

Dnd is also subgroup of D2nh.

Examples 

Dnh, [n], (*22n):

D5h, [5], (*225):

D4d, [8,2+], (2*4):

D5d, [10,2+], (2*5):

D17d, [34,2+],  (2*17):

See also
 List of spherical symmetry groups
 Point groups in three dimensions
 Cyclic symmetry in three dimensions

References 

 N.W. Johnson: Geometries and Transformations, (2018)  Chapter 11: Finite symmetry groups, 11.5 Spherical Coxeter groups

External links 
Graphic overview of the 32 crystallographic point groups – form the first parts (apart from skipping n=5) of the 7 infinite series and 5 of the 7 separate 3D point groups

Symmetry
Euclidean symmetries
Group theory